The Samsung SGH-t309 is a GSM flip phone made by Samsung electronics. It operates on T-Mobile's GSM network.  It includes text messaging, voice messaging, and an internal VGA camera.

References

Samsung mobile phones
Mobile phones introduced in 2005